Shir Darreh or Shirdarreh may refer to:
 Shir Darreh, Gilan
 Shir Darreh, Mazandaran